Stephen Brian Wooldridge  (17 October 1977 – 14 August 2017) was an Australian racing cyclist, an Olympic and four-time world champion on the track. He was born in Sydney. He was an Australian Institute of Sport scholarship holder.

In 2005, Wooldridge was awarded a Medal of the Order of Australia for service to sport as a gold medallist at the 2004 Summer Olympics in Athens. He was inducted into the NSW Hall of Champions in 2015.

Wooldridge committed suicide on 14 August 2017. The method was not made public.

Major results

2002
UCI Track Cycling World Championships, Copenhagen, Denmark
 1st, Team Pursuit (with Peter Dawson, Brett Lancaster and Luke Roberts)
Commonwealth Games, Manchester, England
 1st, Team Pursuit
2002 Track Cycling World Cup
 2nd, Team Pursuit, Sydney

2003
UCI Track Cycling World Championships, Copenhagen, Denmark
 1st, Team Pursuit (with Peter Dawson, Brett Lancaster, Graeme Brown and Luke Roberts)

2004
Olympic Games, Athens, Greece
1st, Team Pursuit

UCI Track Cycling World Championships, Melbourne, Australia
 1st, Team Pursuit (with Luke Roberts, Peter Dawson and Ashley Hutchinson)

2004 Track Cycling World Cup
 3rd, Team Pursuit, Manchester

2005
National Track Championships, Adelaide
 2nd, Team Pursuit
 2nd, Pursuit

UCI Track Cycling World Championships, Los Angeles, United States
 3rd, Team Pursuit

2006
Commonwealth Games, Melbourne, Australia
 2nd, Team Pursuit
UCI Track Cycling World Championships, Bordeaux, France
 1st, Team Pursuit (with Peter Dawson, Matt Goss and Mark Jamieson)

2007
 1st, Stage 5, Tour of Siam

Personal life
Woolridge had a son and daughter from his first marriage. He had a stepdaughter from his second marriage.

References

External links 

1977 births
2017 suicides
Australian male cyclists
Commonwealth Games silver medallists for Australia
Cyclists at the 2004 Summer Olympics
Cyclists at the 2006 Commonwealth Games
Olympic cyclists of Australia
Olympic gold medalists for Australia
UCI Track Cycling World Champions (men)
People educated at Sydney Technical High School
Cyclists from Sydney
Australian Institute of Sport cyclists
Medalists at the 2004 Summer Olympics
Commonwealth Games medallists in cycling
Recipients of the Medal of the Order of Australia
Suicides in Australia
Australian track cyclists
Medallists at the 2006 Commonwealth Games